Marinimicrobia is a candidate phylum of bacteria, previously known as SAR406, MGA or Marine Group A. They have been found mainly at great depths such as the Challenger Deep, the Mariana Trench, and the Puerto Rico Trench. This phylum has a low representation in shallow pelagic samples and high abundance in deep samples. Although these bacteria are often associated with low dissolved oxygen environments, very little is known about their ecology and metabolic functions. Marinimicrobia form part of the FCB group along with other related bacterial phyla.

References 

Bacteria phyla